Epigomphus is a genus of dragonflies in the family Gomphidae. They are commonly known as Knobtails.

The genus contains the following species:
Epigomphus armatus 
Epigomphus camelus  – Humped Knobtail
Epigomphus clavatus  – Guatemalan Knobtail
Epigomphus compactus 
Epigomphus corniculatus  – Horned Knobtail
Epigomphus crepidus  – West Mexican Knobtail
Epigomphus donnellyi  – Donnelly's Knobtail
Epigomphus echeverrii  – Volcano Knobtail
Epigomphus flinti  – Flint's Knobtail
Epigomphus gibberosus 
Epigomphus houghtoni  – Limón Knobtail
Epigomphus hylaeus 
Epigomphus jannyae 
Epigomphus llama 
Epigomphus maya  – Maya Knobtail
Epigomphus obtusus 
Epigomphus occipitalis 
Epigomphus paludosus 
Epigomphus paulsoni  – Paulson's Knobtail
Epigomphus pechumani 
Epigomphus quadracies 
Epigomphus subobtusus 
Epigomphus subquadrices 
Epigomphus subsimilis  – Alajuela Knobtail
Epigomphus sulcatistyla  – Tuxtla Knobtail
Epigomphus tumefactus 
Epigomphus verticicornis  – Cartago Knobtail
Epigomphus westfalli  – Westfall's Knobtail

References

Gomphidae
Taxonomy articles created by Polbot